Jack Higginson (1876 – after 1901) was an English professional footballer who played in the Football League for Small Heath. He played as a left-sided forward.

Higginson was born in Dudley, which was then in Worcestershire, and played for Gornal Wood and Dudley Town before joining Small Heath in 1900. On his debut in the Second Division on 6 October 1900, Higginson scored the second goal in a 2–0 home win against Burton Swifts, and followed this up with goals in the next two games. Unable to maintain this level of goalscoring, Higginson lost his place to the newly arrived Johnny McMillan. He played only rarely after the club's promotion to the First Division, and returned to non-league football with Stourbridge in 1902.

References

1876 births
Year of death missing
Sportspeople from Dudley
English footballers
Association football forwards
Birmingham City F.C. players
Stourbridge F.C. players
English Football League players
Date of birth missing
Place of death missing
Dudley Town F.C. players